Four ships of the Royal Navy have borne the name HMS Postillion, after the Postilion, the driver of a horse-drawn coach or post chaise, mounted on one of the drawing horses:

 was a 10-gun sixth rate, previously the French Postillion.
 was an 18-gun sloop, previously the French privateer Duc D'Aiguillon. She was captured in 1757 and was sold in 1763.
 was a 10-gun schooner purchased in 1776 and sold in 1779.
 was an  launched in 1943 and transferred to the navy under lend-lease. She was returned to the United States Navy in 1946, and sold to the Greek Navy in 1947 and renamed Machitis. She was sunk as a target in 1984.

Royal Navy ship names